"Summer Jam" is a song by German dance band R.I.O., featuring vocals from Pop, R&B and Hip-Hop singer U-Jean. The song was released in Germany as a digital download on July 27, 2012. It samples the chorus from The Underdog Project's "Summer Jam" (2001).

Music video
A music video to accompany the release of "Summer Jam" was first released onto YouTube on July 27, 2012 at a total length of three minutes and eleven seconds.

Track listing
 Digital download
 "Summer Jam" - 3:02
 "Summer Jam" (Crew Cardinal Radio Edit) - 3:35
 "Summer Jam" (Crew 7 Radio Edit) - 2:57
 "Summer Jam" (Extended Mix) - 4:27
 "Summer Jam" (Crew Cardinal Remix) - 5:48
 "Summer Jam" (Crew 7 Remix) - 4:53

Chart performance

Year-end charts

Release history

References

2012 singles
R.I.O. songs
2011 songs
Kontor Records singles